Mark Lee (born 1958) is an Australian theatre and film actor and director, and singer.  He played the lead role in the 1981 film Gallipoli, alongside Mel Gibson. Since then, Lee has worked extensively in Australian film, television and theatre.

Career
He originally worked as a model and coffee house singer. His film debut was in 1969 in the film Strange Holiday (based on the novel by Jules Verne). After his success in Gallipoli (1981) he spent some time as a musician, playing and singing as front man in popular Sydney bands like One Way Ticket and The Idle Poor, performed in company with his Conservatorium-trained, violin-playing younger brother, David.

Lee also spent some years acting in, and frequently simultaneously directing, amateur plays.

He starred in the 1987 Australian television drama Vietnam (one of Nicole Kidman's early roles) and the 1988 gay cult film The Everlasting Secret Family. He also starred as a gay man in Sex Is a Four Letter Word. Lee also worked with James Belushi in the remake of Sahara in 1995. In 2000 he starred in Nowhere to Land as the antagonist Phillip Decon.

Apart from Gallipoli, most of his work has drawn little notice outside of Australia, save for a short film Stranger So Familiar, shown in the 2005 Reno Film Festival.

In 2001, he starred in the one-man show The Time Machine, adapted by Frank Gauntlett from the novelette by H. G. Wells, and directed by Penny Young. He also appeared in the acclaimed and controversial production of The Miracle Rose at Belvoir Street Theatre in Sydney, directed by film and theatre Robert Chuter.

His feature film directorial debut was an Australian film titled The Bet, released in 2007. He also made a documentary Mountains to the Sea, about a couple of pub bands, and directed the play Unit 46 in 1999.

In 2012, he reprised his role in The Time Machine at The Old 505 Theatre, Sydney.

In 2013/2014, he toured Australia in the theatrical production of a play based upon Agatha Christie's A Murder Is Announced, playing the character of Inspector Craddock. In 2013, he featured in the TV mini-series Paper Giants: Magazine Wars. Since 2015, he has had a recurring role in the TV series A Place To Call Home.

As of 2019, he is acting as Rick Booth (Dean's biological father) on Seven's Home and Away.

Personal life
Lee enjoys cooking and traveling with his wife Marianne. The couple have two daughters.

Filmography

References

External links
 

1958 births
Date of birth missing (living people)
Male actors from Sydney
Australian male film actors
Australian film directors
Australian male stage actors
Australian theatre directors
20th-century Australian male singers
Living people